University Field at Andre Reed Stadium (or simply Andre Reed Stadium, formerly University Field) is an outdoor college football stadium located in Kutztown, Pennsylvania on the campus of Kutztown University of Pennsylvania. It is home to both Kutztown's football and field hockey programs competing in the PSAC. The stadium has a capacity of 5,600 making it the ninth largest venue in the PSAC.

University Field was renamed to University Field at Andre Reed Stadium on October 18, 2014 in a ceremony honoring Andre Reed, a former football player at Kutztown and in the National Football League who was inducted into the Pro Football Hall of Fame.

References

American football venues in Pennsylvania
Buildings and structures in Berks County, Pennsylvania
College field hockey venues in the United States
College football venues
Kutztown Golden Bears football